Jolanta Januchta-Strzelczyk (born 16 January 1955) is a Polish former middle-distance runner specialising in the 800 metres. She won the gold medal at the 1980 European Indoor Championships and bronze at the 1982 edition. In addition, she represented her country at the 1980 Summer Olympics as well as the 1983 World Championships.

Her personal best of 1:56.95 is the still standing national record.

She is currently a physical education teacher at a primary school in Warsaw.

International competitions

1Representing Europe

Personal bests
Outdoor
400 metres – 55.73 (Wanganui 1984)
800 metres – 1:56.95 (Budapest 1980)
1000 metres – 2:32.70 (Zürich 1981)
1500 metres – 4:13.63 (Bydgoszcz 1983)

Indoor
600 metres – 1:26.6 (Warsaw 1980)
800 metres – 2:00.6 (Sindelfingen 1980)

References

External links
All-Athletics profile

1955 births
Living people
People from Bielsko-Biała
Polish female middle-distance runners
World Athletics Championships athletes for Poland
Athletes (track and field) at the 1980 Summer Olympics
Olympic athletes of Poland
20th-century Polish women
21st-century Polish women